The following is a list of county routes in Cumberland County in the U.S. state of New Jersey.  For more information on the county route system in New Jersey as a whole, including its history, see County routes in New Jersey.

500-series county routes
In addition to those listed below, the following 500-series county routes serve Cumberland County:
CR 540, CR 548, CR 550, CR 550 Spur, CR 552, CR 552 Spur, CR 553, CR 555

Other county routes

See also

References

 
Cumberland